"Invincible" is a single by OK Go from their Do What You Want EP and their 2005 album Oh No. It was released as a single in 2006 for US radio stations only. It was featured in the films The Fog and She's the Man and in the TV series One Tree Hill and CSI: NY.

Track listing

U.S. promo CD single
 "Invincible" (edit)
 "Invincible" (album version)

Music video
A music video was made in 2006 to promote the song. Co-directed by OK Go and Mike Barnett, it features the band performing the song in front of various wallpapers, accompanied by explosions of furniture and objects. The music video was first shown on June 14, 2006, on MySpace.

External links
 Official video for "Invincible" on YouTube

2006 singles
OK Go songs
Songs written by Damian Kulash
2005 songs
Capitol Records singles